Alan Lawrence (born 19 August 1962 in Edinburgh), also known as "Nipper", is a Scottish former footballer, best known for his time spent with Airdrieonians and Heart of Midlothian in the early and mid-1990s. He also worked as a coach with Airdrie United in the Scottish First and Second Divisions.

Early career
Lawrence made his senior debut with local club Meadowbank Thistle. Having found a foothold in the professional game as a diminutive, nippy striker, he was soon on the way up, signing for Dundee late in the 1986–87 season. Further goalscoring exploits there saw him move to Airdrieonians two years later, where although being used chiefly as a forward, he would also be deployed as a winger. Lawrence's consistent performances in an era when Airdrie reached a Scottish Cup Final in 1992, and subsequently made their only foray into European football in their history the following season, cemented his place as a legend with the Airdrie faithful. In all, 'Nipper' would go on to make over 200 appearances for the Diamonds, scoring over 50 goals, culminating in a second Scottish Cup final appearance in 1995, again ending in defeat.

To Hearts and back
Further success at Airdrie saw Lawrence signed by Hearts in summer 1995. Only a year later however, after 34 appearances and 7 goals (plus a third losing Scottish Cup Final appearance) he was on his way back to Airdrie, where he spent another year and a half. In December 1997, he was released to Partick Thistle, scoring three goals in seventeen league appearances. His short tenure at Firhill ended when he signed for Third Division side Stenhousemuir in the summer of 1998.

Stenhousemuir 1998–2000
Alan's two years with "The Warriors" are fondly remembered. He burst onto the scene at Ochilview with a hatful of crucial goals, most notably a hat-trick in a 5–1 trouncing of Albion Rovers, as the club chased promotion. It was in mid-season however, with a surplus of strikers and shortages elsewhere in the squad, that Nipper was moved to right-back, where it was thought his experience of playing as a winger would benefit the team. He did not disappoint, turning in solid performances week in, week out, including a Scottish Cup tie against Rangers in January 1999, in which the team performed admirably. The move to defence didn't dampen his appetite for goals either, and he chipped in with some vital strikes in the club's hunt for promotion. Indeed, his last minute volley to win at Montrose late in the season set the tone for Stenhousemuir's promotion just a matter of weeks later, the first in the club's history.

His second season at Ochilview was tougher, as it was for all involved with the club, as the inevitable battle to stave off relegation ensued. Stenhousemuir would survive that season, but despite this, his close relationship with the fans, and his desire to stay, Alan departed in August 2000 following an alleged difference of opinion with the club's board of directors.

Late playing career and coaching
Over the next few years, Lawrence acted as player-coach at Cowdenbeath. He rejoined Airdrie in 2002, but made no appearances. He also spent two years with Arbroath, playing three games.

In 2006, Lawrence coached junior side Bathgate Thistle to the final of the OVD Scottish Junior Cup, where they were narrowly defeated by Auchinleck Talbot. Bathgate and Lawrence eventually got their hands on the trophy in 2008, beating Cumnock in the final.

Personal life
Lawrence made an appearance in the Scottish football film A Shot at Glory in 2000, alongside The Godfather star Robert Duvall, as well as Michael Keaton and Ally McCoist.

After being at Airdrie United for several years as assistant coach, in June 2012 Lawrence left the club citing "work commitments". However it was later reported that he had resigned from being a postman and was under investigation by The Royal Mail for mail theft. In February 2014, having pleaded guilty to the offence, he was sentenced to 100 hours of unpaid work.

Honours
Airdrieonians
Scottish Challenge Cup: 1994–95

See also
 List of footballers in Scotland by number of league appearances (500+)

References

1962 births
Living people
Footballers from Edinburgh
Scottish footballers
Airdrieonians F.C. (1878) players
Dundee F.C. players
Heart of Midlothian F.C. players
Partick Thistle F.C. players
Stenhousemuir F.C. players
Cowdenbeath F.C. players
Arbroath F.C. players
Airdrieonians F.C. players
Scottish Football League players
Association football forwards
Association football wingers
British people convicted of theft
21st-century Scottish criminals
Sportspeople convicted of crimes